James Allen Byrne (27 January 1911 – 5 September 1975) was a Liberal party member of the House of Commons of Canada. He was born in Grand Rapids, Minnesota, United States and became a miner by career.

He was first elected at the Kootenay East riding in the 1949 general election, then re-elected there in the 1953, 1957, 1962, 1963 and 1965 elections.

Byrne was not in Parliament for one term during this time due to his defeat in the 1958 election by Murray McFarlane of the Progressive Conservative party.

Byrne was Parliamentary Secretary to the Minister of Transport from 1966 to 1968, and also served as Parliamentary Secretary to the Minister of Labour from 1963 to 1965.

External links
 

1911 births
1975 deaths
People from Grand Rapids, Minnesota
American emigrants to Canada
Members of the House of Commons of Canada from British Columbia
Liberal Party of Canada MPs